Francois Alwyn (Frans) Venter (27 November 1916 – 8 July 1997) was a prominent Afrikaans writer of the 20th century. His novels explored biblical religious themes, or cultural identities in the South African context. He also examined relations between white and black more closely in Wit oemfaan, which describes a white boy's discovery of the customs of the Zulu nation. Swart pelgrim on the other hand relates the experiences and observations of a migrant from a black rural setting to the industrialised, white-dominated environment. He may be best known for his novel Geknelde land (Afrikaans for Afflicted land), which describes the Eastern Cape Boer community living under Xhosa raids and the English governance of the 19th century.

Early life
He was born in Hopetown, and grew up on his parents' farm in the Britstown district. He attended rural schools at first, before attending the Strydenburg Secondary School, and matriculating from Hopetown High School in 1934. He studied at the University of Stellenbosch and commenced a career as journalist in 1938.

Adult career
For 25 years he worked as a journalist in Cape Town, Pretoria, Windhoek and Johannesburg. He also wrote popular fiction, under the pseudonyms Meiring Fouché, Elske te Water, René Stegmann and Marius de Jongh. In 1960 he began farming in the Kenhardt district near Vanwyksvlei, where his parents had resided since the 1930s. In 1967 he had to leave the northern Cape due to declining health and settled in Strand, meaning to write full-time. In 1970, however, he returned to farming, this time as viticulturist at Vredendal in the Olifants river valley. In 1976 when his health deteriorated again, he retired for good from farming and returned to Strand.

Recognition
Venter received the Hertzog Prize for prose in 1976 for his novels Swart pelgrim and Geknelde land. For Kambrokind he received the ruitertrofee ('equestrian trophy') of the Suid-Afrikaanse Federasie van Rapportryerskorpse in 1982. In 1981 the University of Port Elizabeth awarded him the honorary degree D. Litt in recognition for his writings. In 1996 he received the Andrew Murray Prize for Literature. He was in addition a member of the Maatschappij der Nederlandse Letterkunde (a Dutch society for literature).

F.A. Venter died in 1997.

Writings
The English names given, are translated from Afrikaans, and are not available under those titles.
 Die geheim van die berg (The mystery of the mountain) (1944/1958) (young adult novel)
 Gebondenes (The fettered) (1949)
 Eenderse morge (Similar morgen) (1950)
 Die drosters (The deserters) (1952)
 Swart pelgrim (Black pilgrim) (1952)
 Die tollenaar (The tax collector) (1954)
 Man van Ciréne (Man of Cyrene) (1957)
 Geknelde land (Afflicted land) (1960)
 Offerland (Land of sacrifice) (1963)
 Werfjoernaal (Yard journal) (1965)
 Wit oemfaan (White umfane) (1965) (young-adult novel)
 Gelofteland (Land of the covenant) (1966)
 Bedoelde land (Intended land) (1968)
 Die rentmeesters (The landlords) (1969)
 Water (Water) (1970) Commissioned by the Ministry of Water
 Die middag voel na warm as (The afternoon feels like warm ash) (1974)
 Kambro-kind (Kambro child) (1979)
 Die koning se wingerd (The king's vineyard) (1984)
 Die ou man en die duif (The old man and the dove) (1990)
 Die keer toe ek my naam vergeet het (The time when I forgot my name) (1995)
 Van Botterkraal na Altena: hoogtepunte uit vier outobiografiese romans (From Botterkraal to Altena: highlights from four autobiographical novels) (1996)

References

South African male novelists
South African journalists
South African people of Dutch descent
Afrikaner people
South African expatriates in Namibia
1916 births
Afrikaans-language writers
1997 deaths
Hertzog Prize winners for prose
20th-century South African novelists
20th-century South African male writers
20th-century journalists